"Come On, Come On" is a song by Smash Mouth from their 1999 album Astro Lounge. The song was first recorded for The East Bay Sessions, a demo recorded prior to the band's first album, and was also included on Smash Mouth's 2005 best-of album, All Star Smash Hits.

Reception
A reviewer for The A.V. Club referred to "Come On, Come On" as "over-the-top pop" in a positive review for Astro Lounge. Martin Huxley of BMI's MusicWorld cited "Come On, Come On" as an example of a song that demonstrates Smash Mouth's "pithy mix of... punk, ska, hip-hop, surf, bubblegum and psychedelic influences."

In other media
"Come On, Come On" has appeared in several movies and has been released on soundtracks, including:
Deuce Bigalow: Male Gigolo (1999)
Dude, Where's My Car? (2000)
Snow Day (2000)
Big Fat Liar (2002)
Zoom (2006)

The song was also featured in the "Queen Bebe" episode of Kim Possible, a Gap commercial, and in a trailer for the 2000 film Drowning Mona.

References

External links

1999 songs
Smash Mouth songs
Songs written by Greg Camp
Song recordings produced by Eric Valentine
American new wave songs